"Live In This City" is an electropop/new wave song performed by Canadian band Dragonette. The song was written and produced by Dragonette for their third studio album Bodyparts (2012). It was released as the album's second single in August 2012.

Music video
The official music video for the track premiered September 17, 2012, on Dragonette's official YouTube channel.

Charts

Track listing

Digital download 
(Released )

Digital Remix EP 
(Released )

References

2012 singles
2012 songs
Dragonette songs
Songs written by Martina Sorbara
Songs written by Dan Kurtz